Manpur, Nepal may refer to:

Manpur, Janakpur
Manpur, Lumbini
Manpur, Rapti

See also  
Manpur (disambiguation)